Kwok Ka Ming MBE, JP (born 30 October 1949) is a Hong Kong former professional footballer and coach.

Early life
Kwok graduated from St. Francis Xavier's College where he played in the school basketball and table tennis team. He joined the Hong Kong Football Association junior training course in 1965.  Kwok Ka Ming joined Hong Kong first division team Hong Kong Rangers at the age of 18. He played at the right side of midfield for both Rangers and Hong Kong in the 1970s. He retired from playing in 1980, when he was just 30 years old. He took part in three Asian Cup qualifiers (1972, 1976 & 1980) and two World Cup qualifiers (1974 & 1978).

He was award the "10 Outstanding Youths of Hong Kong" award in 1977 for his contribution to Hong Kong football after helping Hong Kong reach the final round of World Cup qualifiers, along with  Hong Kong movie director Michael Hui.

1985 match against China PR

Kwok later became the coach of the Hong Kong football team, guiding the team to a decisive victory against China PR by 2-1 at the Workers Stadium in Beijing, China on 19 May 1985, during a 1986 FIFA World Cup qualifying game.

Although the two teams drew 0-0 in their first match in Hong Kong, China PR was considered to be stronger and was favoured to win the group. Due to superior goal difference, China only needed a draw to proceed to the next round. However, a 20-yard freekick by Hong Kong's Cheung Chi Tak (張志德) opened the scoring. China PR replied with Li Hui (李輝)'s goal but another well taken goal by Ku Kam Fai (顧錦輝) sealed the win for Hong Kong and sent China PR out of the 1986 World Cup.

The loss to Hong Kong delayed China PR's World Cup entry for another 16 years before they finally appeared in Korea Japan 2002. After the game, Chinese fans rioted outside the stadium, while the Hong Kong team received a heroic welcome at the Kai Tak Airport.

The victory was passionately remembered by Hong Kong football fans as "The 5.19 Victory".

1986 FIFA World Cup Asia Qualifying Playoffs
Hong Kong thus earned the right to play Japan for two home-and-away ties in the second qualifying round. Kwok led the team to Kobe where they lost the first leg 3-0.

The return leg at the Hong Kong Stadium was a complete sell-out but the home side lost 2-1 after missing a penalty  and a number of other chances. 

Japan went through 5-1 on aggregate but then went down 3-1 on aggregate to South Korea in the final round and missed the chance to qualify for the finals in Mexico in the following June.

Other tournaments
He has been, for many different tournaments, including the 2006 FIFA World Cup and 2014 FIFA World Cup, a member of The FIFA Technical Study Group.

Honours
Kwok was appointed Member of the Order of the British Empire (MBE) in the 1978 Birthday Honours "for services to Sport in Hong Kong."

References

1949 births
Living people
Hong Kong footballers
Hong Kong Rangers FC players
Hong Kong football managers
Hong Kong national football team managers
Hong Kong First Division League players
Association football wingers
Members of the Order of the British Empire